Carelyn Cordero (born February 1, 1994) is table tennis player for Puerto Rico who has achieved international recognition for her performance.

Record
Cordero was number one in the girls competition in Rekordspelen 2011 and played in women's singles at the Guadalajara 2011 Pan American Games. She was first in the teams competition at the 2014 Central American and Caribbean Games, and first in the girls doubles at 2014 Latin American youth championships. She earned the bronze medal in the teams at the 2015  Toronto Pan American Games.

See also

List of Puerto Ricans
Sports in Puerto Rico

References

Living people
Puerto Rican table tennis players
Table tennis players at the 2010 Summer Youth Olympics
1994 births
Puerto Rican women
Pan American Games medalists in table tennis
Pan American Games bronze medalists for Puerto Rico
People from Jayuya, Puerto Rico
Table tennis players at the 2015 Pan American Games
Central American and Caribbean Games gold medalists for Puerto Rico
Central American and Caribbean Games medalists in table tennis
Competitors at the 2014 Central American and Caribbean Games
Medalists at the 2015 Pan American Games